Delta is a city in the Lower Mainland region of British Columbia, Canada, as part of Greater Vancouver. Located on the Fraser Lowland south of Fraser River's south arm, it is bordered by the city of Richmond on the Lulu Island to the north, New Westminster to the northeast, Surrey to the east, the Boundary Bay and the American pene-exclave Point Roberts to the south, and the Strait of Georgia to the west.

Encompassing the nearby Annacis Island, Deas Island and Westham Island, Delta is mostly rural and officially composed of three distinct communities: North Delta, Ladner and Tsawwassen.

History
Prior to European settlement, Delta's flatlands and coastal shores were inhabited by the Tsawwassen First Nation of the Coast Salish. The land was first sighted by Europeans in 1791, when Spanish explorer Lieutenant Francisco de Eliza mistook the area for an island and named it "Isla de Cepeda". The first European settler in Delta was James Kennedy who pre-empted 135 acres in what later became Annieville in February 1860. Thomas and William Ladner, began farming the area named after them in 1868. Farming and fishing helped the community grow quickly over the next few decades. In 1879, the area was incorporated as a municipality, named "the Corporation of Delta", and the village of Ladner was made as its administrative centre.

Due to its geography, Delta was a relatively isolated community. The completion of the George Massey Tunnel in 1959 linking Ladner to Richmond and Vancouver along with the opening, in 1960, of the Tsawwassen Ferry Terminal and the Highway 99 being rerouted from the King George Highway in Surrey in 1962 to a new route through Delta, ended Delta's isolation and resulted in a massive 400% population growth over the next 20 years. The 1986 completion of the Alex Fraser Bridge connecting North Delta to New Westminster and Vancouver also helped Delta's growth.

On 22 September 2017, at the request of Delta's council, the Government of British Columbia changed the name and classification of the Corporation of Delta to the City of Delta.

Neighbourhoods
Delta comprises three distinct, geographically separate communities:
North Delta (pop: 51,623) is home to over half of Delta's population. It is a largely suburban area in north-east Delta bordered by the Burns Bog and Surrey.
Ladner (pop: 21,112) is a 19th-century fishing village in north-west Delta that has expanded into a suburb. Fishing and farming are important industries. Ladner Trunk Road is its main street.
Tsawwassen (pop: 20,933) is a suburban community in south-west Delta that calls itself the sunniest place in Metro Vancouver. Luxury waterfront homes line Tsawwassen's coast. Tsawwassen is also home to the busy Tsawwassen Ferry Terminal which links the mainland to Vancouver Island and the Gulf Islands. Tsawwassen, together with Ladner are also known as South Delta.

Demographics

In 2011, the median age was 42.8 years old, which is slightly higher than the national median age at 40.6 years old. There were 35,781 private dwellings with an occupancy rate of 97.1%. According to the 2011 National Household Survey, the median value of a dwelling in Delta is $562,181 which is significantly higher than the national average at $280,552. The median household income (after-taxes) in Delta is $71,590, quite higher than the national average at $54,089.

Ethnicity
As of 2021, Delta's population is 108,455. About 45% of Delta's population are visible minorities, of which there are approximately 28,000 South Asian Canadians, 9,700 Chinese Canadians, and 3,700 Filipino Canadians. There are also about 3,180 Indigenous peoples or 3% of the total population, some from Tsawwassen First Nation, who still hold a fraction of their former traditional territories; the Tsawwassen Lands at the mouth of the Fraser River, which are shared with the Hwlitsum First Nation from the Gulf Islands. Forming over one-quarter (26.1%) of the population, Delta has the fourth largest municipal South Asian population in British Columbia after neighbouring Vancouver, Surrey and Abbotsford.

Religion 
According to the 2021 census, religious groups in Delta included:
Irreligion (42,990 persons or 40.1%)
Christianity (35,025 persons or 32.7%)
Sikhism (19,235 persons or 17.9%)
Hinduism (4,195 persons or 3.9%)
Islam (3,265 persons or 3.0%)
Buddhism (1,450 persons or 1.4%)
Judaism (475 persons or 0.4%)
Indigenous spirituality (20 persons or 0%)

Geography

It is bordered by water on three sides: The Fraser River to the north, the Georgia Strait to the west and Boundary Bay to the south.

Delta's flat, fertile land has made it one of the most important agricultural areas in Greater Vancouver. The Agricultural Land Reserve regulations preserve most of this land for agricultural use, preventing its conversion to suburban housing. North Delta is also home to the Burns Bog,  of natural wetlands that are important for wildlife.

Delta includes Annacis Island, an industrial island reached via the Alex Fraser Bridge, which connects Delta with Richmond and New Westminster. Delta also includes a peninsula on the east side of the Fraser River at Delta's northern city limits, which is only accessible via Surrey.

Climate
Delta is known for its relatively dry and sunny climate compared with other locations in Metro Vancouver. For example, it receives nearly 40% less precipitation than downtown Vancouver and less than half of that of North Vancouver. It has a warm-summer Mediterranean climate (Köppen Csb) with cooler summers and milder winters than other areas on the Canada–U.S. border, and features some of the mildest winters and lowest diurnal temperature variation in Canada.

Government and politics
Delta is governed by the Delta City Council, led by a Mayor and six Councillors, elected for four-year terms, and there is also an elected school board. The current mayor is George Harvie. Unlike most communities in Canada, but like Vancouver and Richmond, Delta has a system of locally based election slates such as TriDelta, IDEA, One Delta, Delta Residents Association, Delta Connect, DIVA, Independents Working For You, and Achieving For Delta.

In the House of Commons of Canada, Delta is part of the Delta electoral district. As of the 2015 Federal general election, Delta's seat is held by Carla Qualtrough of the Liberal Party. In the 2017 Provincial general election, the North Delta seat went to Ravi Kahlon of the British Columbia New Democratic Party while the South Delta seat went to Ian Paton of the British Columbia Liberal Party. 

Delta, unlike most Lower Mainland municipalities, has its own police department.

Former Delta mayor Lois Jackson served from 1999 to 2018 and since 1973 has had a seat on Delta Council. Jackson was elected to council again in 2018.

Power
In Delta is the Arnott Substation (ARN), the mainland terminal of the HVDC Vancouver Island circuit.

Transportation

Public transportation in Delta is a bus system provided by TransLink. There is no rapid transit system in Delta, though the SkyTrain system in Surrey comes within  of the city's borders.
Delta is a major transportation hub for the Lower Mainland. Most vehicles leaving Vancouver for the United States pass through Delta's borders. Many vehicles destined for Vancouver Island use the Tsawwassen ferry terminal in Delta.
Highway 99 links Richmond to Delta via the George Massey Tunnel, built in 1959. North Delta is linked to New Westminster and Richmond by Highway 91 and the massive Alex Fraser Bridge (opened in 1986). Delta is linked to Surrey, Langley, and all points eastward by Highway 10. Traffic congestion during rush hour is quite common, although improvements area being made to Highway 91 interchanges at 72 Ave to remove a traffic light as well the ramps from Nordel Way. 
Highway 17 in Delta provides a connection to the Tsawwassen B.C. Ferry terminal, which provides car ferry connections to Vancouver Island and the Gulf Islands. In December 2013, north of the current junction with Deltaport Way, Highway 17 will be rerouted upon completion of the "South Fraser Perimeter Road", and will primarily run parallel to River Road through Tilbury and North Delta to all points east. The remaining stretch of Highway 17 north of that point will be renamed Highway 17A.
River Road is also another connector through the municipality. River Road starts in Surrey and heads westbound through North Delta, under the Alex Fraser Bridge, north of Burns Bog, and then terminates at 62B Street, which then turns into Highway 17A.
Like River Road, the western communities of "South Delta" (Ladner and Tsawwassen) are linked to North Delta and communities to the east by Ladner Trunk Road; east of its crossover of Highway 91, the road becomes Highway 10.
56th Street is another major artery in the community, bisecting the Tsawwassen region; it is the only road leading into the community of Point Roberts, south of the Canada–US border.
Delta is also home to Boundary Bay Airport, Canada's seventh busiest airport by aircraft movements. Boundary Bay Airport is primarily used for private aircraft, commercial charters, and flying lessons.

Major highways

Health 
Delta is the westernmost community served by Fraser Health Authority which operates Delta Hospital in Ladner and also funds home and community care. The Delta Hospice Society operates a facility near to the hospital.

Education 
Delta Public Schools operates Anglophone public schools in the city.

The Conseil scolaire francophone de la Colombie-Britannique operates one Francophone primary school in that city: école du Bois-joli.

Sports and recreation
Delta has many minor sports teams in ice hockey, soccer, football, field hockey, baseball, softball, field lacrosse and box lacrosse. Over 160 young people play ringette in Delta. The Delta Ringette Association has 13 teams in 2005. Notable professional sports players from Delta are Jeff Francis (MLB), James Paxton (MLB), Justin Morneau (MLB), Brent Seabrook (NHL), Troy Brouwer (NHL) and Mitch Berger (NFL).
 Delta's unique and varying terrain provides a challenging test for many of the world's best cyclists in the Tour de Delta (one day races, for men since 2001, and for women since 2011). Since its first event in 2001, the Tour de Delta has grown to be Canada's largest cycling event, held annually in July as part of BC Superweek.
The Delta Triathlon is also a very popular event, selling out each year in April. The event takes place in Ladner from the Ladner Leisure Centre. Over 500 participants take part, including many from the local South Delta Triathlon Club.

Notable people

Vince Abbott, former professional American football player; kicker for the San Diego Chargers (1987–1988)
Dylan Ainsworth, CFL player
Mitch Berger, former professional American football player; punter for eight National Football League teams
Adam Braidwood, professional Canadian football player; defensive end for the Edmonton Eskimos
Troy Brouwer, former professional hockey player
Tyler Connolly, Musician, Singer, Songwriter, Guitarist;  vocalist and guitarist for the rock band, Theory of a Deadman
John Cummins, Canadian politician; Formerly the Conservative Member of Parliament for the riding of Delta—Richmond East, Former leader of the BC Conservative Party
Martin Cummins, Canadian actor
Kevin Eiben, professional Canadian football player; linebacker for the Toronto Argonauts
Jeff Francis, professional baseball player; starting pitcher for the Colorado Rockies
Michael Lee, Canadian field hockey player
Brandon McMillan, professional hockey player; forward for HC Neftekhimik Nizhnekamsk
Tyson Mulock, professional hockey player; centre who has played in the Deutsche Eishockey Liga
Gary Nylund, former professional hockey player; defenceman for the Toronto Maple Leafs, Chicago Blackhawks, and New York Islanders
Kyle O'Reilly, professional wrestler
Jason Priestley, Canadian actor and director
Dave Randorf, Canadian sportscaster, currently works for Rogers Sportsnet
Byron Ritchie, former professional hockey player
Mark Rogers, former professional soccer player, Men's National Team Assistant Coach
Davis Sanchez, professional Canadian football player; cornerback for the BC Lions
Will Sasso, Canadian comedian and actor
Brent Seabrook, professional hockey player; defenceman for the Chicago Blackhawks
Rob Short, Canadian field hockey player
Marie Warder, writer and founder of the Canadian Hemochromatosis Society
Brendan Gallagher, professional hockey player; forward for the Montreal Canadiens
Nehemiah George Massey, former MLA for Delta serving from 1956 to 1960. George Massey Tunnel is named for him.
Nic Petan, professional hockey player; forward for the Toronto Maple Leafs

Appearances in film and media
The town is used as the principle filming location for the TV series Resident Alien.

Sister city
 Mangaluru, India (Since 2010)

Notes

References

External links

 
Cities in British Columbia
Populated places in Greater Vancouver
Populated places on the Fraser River